Blastobasis salebrosella is a moth in the  family Blastobasidae. It is found on Madeira.

References

Moths described in 1940
Blastobasis